David Myrton Archer (20 August 1931 – 24 October 1992) was a West Indian cricketer and umpire. He played first-class cricket for the Windward Islands but is best known for standing in 28 Test matches in the West Indies between 1981 and 1992.

Career
Born in Barbados, Archer was a right-hand batsman and slow left-arm bowler. In a club match in Barbados he took 17 wickets, including all ten in one innings. He made three first-class appearances for the Windward Islands. The first came against the touring Australians of 1964–65, when batting at number eleven he scored 11 not out and bowled 10 wicketless overs conceding 50 runs. He played a single match in each of the following two seasons without great success.

Archer took up umpiring, and in February 1976 umpired his maiden first-class game, between Barbados and Jamaica. Five years later he made the step up to international level in a One Day International between England and the West Indies. Later on during England's tour he stood in his first Test.

As well as umpiring in West Indian domestic cricket, Archer also umpired ten matches in England during the 1982 County Championship.

Archer was selected as the West Indian representative for the 1987 World Cup staged in Asia. He stood in five matches in the tournament, which was the first major trial of neutral umpires. His final international umpiring appearance came in April 1992 when he stood in South Africa's first Test back after re-admission, the first-ever Test between South Africa and West Indies. 

Archer was also a publican who ran the Umpires Inn in Barbados. Six months after his last Test match he died in hospital in Barbados after a short illness.

References

External links
Cricinfo Profile
CricketArchive Profile

1931 births
1992 deaths
Windward Islands cricketers
Barbadian cricket umpires
Barbadian cricketers
West Indian Test cricket umpires
West Indian One Day International cricket umpires